Madremyia is a genus of flies in the family Tachinidae.

Species
Madremyia clausa (Villeneuve, 1937)
Madremyia saundersii (Williston, 1889)
Madremyia setinervis (Mesnil, 1968)

References

Diptera of Europe
Diptera of Africa
Diptera of North America
Exoristinae
Tachinidae genera
Taxa named by Charles Henry Tyler Townsend